Cinderella Acappella were an Australian children's music act made up of Blair Greenberg, Jeannie Lewis, Margret RoadKnight and Moya Simpson performing songs written by John Shortis. Their self-titled album (released in 1994) was nominated for the ARIA Award for Best Children's Album in 1995.

Performers
Blair Greenberg
Jeannie Lewis
Margret RoadKnight
Moya Simpson

Discography
Cinderella Acappella (1994) - Rascal Records

Awards and nominations

References

Australian children's musical groups
A cappella musical groups
Musical groups established in 1993
Musical groups disestablished in 1995